They Looked Alike is a 1915 American silent comedy film featuring Oliver Hardy.

Plot

Cast
 C.W. Ritchie as Bill
 Raymond McKee as Sam
 Harry Lorraine as Rube
 Oliver Hardy as Pedestrian (as Babe Hardy)

See also
 List of American films of 1915
 Oliver Hardy filmography

External links

1915 films
American silent short films
American black-and-white films
1915 comedy films
1915 short films
Films directed by Frank Griffin
Silent American comedy films
American comedy short films
1910s American films